Ballynahinch is a barony in west County Galway, Ireland. It sits on the Atlantic coast to the west. The village of Ballynahinch is named after the barony.

Geography 

The barony contains several large bodies of water, including Derryclare Lough, Glendallach Lough, Kylemore Lough and Lough Fee.

Several significant roads pass through the barony including the N59 and several regional roads, R341, R344.

The Connemara National Park is also situated wholly within the barony.

Civil parishes 
The barony contains five civil parishes: Ballindoon, Ballynakill, Inishbofin, Moyrus and Omey

Places of interest 
 Connemara National Park

References 

Baronies of County Galway